The Olusosun dumpsite is a 100-acre
dump in Lagos, Lagos State, Nigeria. It is the largest in Africa, and one of the largest in the world.
The site receives up to 10,000 tons of rubbish each day. Waste from around 500 container ships is also delivered to the site, adding a substantial portion of electronic waste. Some of this material is treated with chemicals to extract reusable products resulting in toxic fumes being released.

Around 1,000 homes exist at the site in shanty towns, occupied by residents who work at the dump scavenging for scrap to sell.

Olusosun landfill was once located on the outskirts of the populated area, however Lagos has, in recent years, undergone such massive expansion, that the site is now surrounded by commercial and residential areas.

References

External links
 Aerial image

Landfills
Electronic waste in Nigeria
Waste management in Lagos